"Nothing in My Way" is a song performed and composed by English alternative rock band Keane for their second studio album Under the Iron Sea (2006). The song was also released 30 October 2006 as the third commercial and fourth overall single from that album in the United Kingdom. After the French pop rock band Bubblies, the single's release is notable as being the first ever commercial music release in USB format, a special edition limited to 1,500 copies.

The song was included as part of the FIFA 07 video game soundtrack.

Background and composition
"Nothing in My Way" was composed by Tim Rice-Oxley in late 2004 and was recorded and at the Heliosentric Studios, Rye, East Sussex and at The Magic Shop, New York City in late 2005. It debuted at the Rolling Stone Roadshow in Germany along with "Hamburg Song" on 20 October 2004. From 2004 to late 2005 (during the final sprint of the Hopes and Fears Tour) was called "Nothing in Your Way" though the lyrics remain almost the same. Rice-Oxley gave this meaning on 16 May 2006:

While the first demos and performances of the song were played in the key of C, the final studio version was recorded with a C sharp tuned 20 cts. above. For live performances this configuration is used too. The reminiscent "Somewhere Only We Know" intro (because of the "piano hammering") includes since then the distorted piano effect sound used in most songs on the album. Vocals are introduced with 24 seconds of playback. The introduction includes a riff created with Keane's distortion piano instrument. The song drives almost the same until the last chorus, when drumming becomes soft and Rice-Oxley plays a small riff with the piano to finally let Tom Chaplin sing again becoming Rice-Oxley the backing vocalist of the outro. Chaplin plays his Hammond organ on live performances for the outro of this song.

B-sides

"Thin Air"
This song was originally listed on Under the Iron Sea but was later dropped. It was also set to appear on the second single "This Is the Last Time", which could mean it was composed sometime in 2004. The song supposedly talks again about the Rice-Oxley-Chaplin relationship.

"Tyderian"
This is Keane's second instrumental, after "The Iron Sea". It has an unusual house-styled dance rhythm never seen before in their material. "Tyderian" is also Keane's first song totally produced, composed, recorded and mixed only by Rice-Oxley, and was recorded at his home.

Music video
The music video for "Nothing in My Way" is a live performance shot at ULU directed by Dick Carruthers and produced by Kit Hawkins for White House Pictures.

The US release music video for "Nothing in My Way" is the identical video for the UK single "Crystal Ball", without clips of the band interspersed through the story, and with subtitles added. At around the time of this single release it was announced that Tom Chaplin had gone into rehab for 'drug and alcohol addiction'. It is noticeable that the original video does not feature any close up shots of Chaplin, but several of Tim Rice-Oxley and Richard Hughes, though it is unknown whether this is deliberate.

Track listing

CD single
Catalogue number: 1712175 
"Nothing in My Way"
"Thin Air"
"Tyderian"

UK 7" vinyl
Catalogue number: 1712200
"Nothing in My Way"
"Thin Air"

512 MB USB memory stick content
 "Nothing in My Way" (Audio)
 "Nothing in My Way" (Video)
 Three screensavers: Tube animations by Corin Hardy
 Link to special page on the website to view an alternative version of "Nothing in My Way" (including a competition to see the band in the US next year)

Charts

References

External links

Keaneshaped - Information about record
Keane.fr - Information about record in French

2006 singles
Keane (band) songs
Songs written by Tim Rice-Oxley
Songs about suicide
Songs written by Tom Chaplin
Songs written by Richard Hughes (musician)